Mahoua Audrey Dembele (born 10 March 2001) is a French female handballer for Paris 92 and the French national team.

She represented France at the 2022 European Women's Handball Championship in Slovenia, Montenegro and North Macedonia.

References

External links

2001 births
Living people
French female handball players
Handball players from Paris
21st-century French women